Stephen Philip Collis (born 18 March 1981 in Harrow, London) is an English former professional footballer who is currently the goalkeeping coach at English League Two club Oldham Athletic.

Club career

Barnet & Nottingham Forest

Collis began his career in the youth team at Watford before moving to Barnet and then signing for Nottingham Forest in 2000.

Yeovil Town

After failing to break into the first team at Nottingham Forest, Collis was invited down by Gary Johnson for a trial match at Yeovil Town and signed the same month on a free transfer. Collis went on to make over forty appearances for the South West outfit. During his stay at Yeovil, Collis spent short loan spells at Tiverton Town and Aldershot Town with failed talks also from Exeter City. Throughout his spell with Yeovil Collis acted as back-up to Chris Weale who was much in favour at the time.

Southend

After leaving Yeovil, Collis signed a two-year contract in 2006 to become Southend's first signing ahead of the new season in The Championship, but was released by the club at the end of the 2007–08 season.

Crewe Alexandra
Following his spell at Southend, Collis signed for Crewe Alexandra as a replacement for departing goalkeeper Ben Williams. His first game in goal saw him save a penalty. On 1 January 2010, Crewe agreed to terminate his contract after he had lost his place to on-loan keeper John Ruddy.

Bristol City 
In January 2010, Collis joined back up with Gary Johnson and signed a short term deal for Football League Championship side Bristol City to take him to the end of the season.

Collis joined Torquay United on a seven-day emergency loan deal on 6 May 2010, for Torquay's final game of the season against Notts County. Collis was released by Bristol City at the end of the season.

Peterborough United

Collis signed a short-term deal with Peterborough United on 6 August 2010. He was then released after his loan move to Northampton Town when Peterborough invested in Exeter City Keeper Paul Jones.

Macclesfield Town
He signed for Macclesfield Town on 23 September 2011 on a short-term contract until January 2012 to provide cover for José Veiga.

Buxton
Collis was signed by Buxton manager Martin McIntosh at the start of the 2012–13 season after participating in several pre-season matches for the Northern Premier League Premier Division side.

Rochdale
On 29 January, Steve Collis signed a short-term deal with Rochdale to take him to the summer. "Goalkeeper Steve Collis was drafted in on Thursday as a replacement for Ben Smith who has departed the club in a bid to find regular football closer to home. Hill explains more: "It is difficult with the 'keeper situation because you're either in goal or you're on the bench. As a centre half you may be able to play full back or in midfield so you've got alternatives, but it's not very often that a goalkeeper will get replaced. It was an ideal situation to get Steve here as he's got experience."

Coaching career

At the end of his playing career he became a player/goalkeeping coach with Rochdale where he spent 5 years before officially hanging up his boots in 2018 upon his departure. Collis then joined former colleague Chris Beech as goalkeeping coach at Carlisle United in August 2020. In July 2021, he made the move to Oldham Athletic, again in the role of goalkeeper coach. Oldham Athletic were relegated from the football league at the end of the 2021-2022 season.

See also
Rochdale A.F.C. season 2014–15

References

External links

1981 births
Footballers from Harrow, London
Living people
Association football goalkeepers
English footballers
Barnet F.C. players
Nottingham Forest F.C. players
Yeovil Town F.C. players
Aldershot Town F.C. players
Tiverton Town F.C. players
Southend United F.C. players
Crewe Alexandra F.C. players
Bristol City F.C. players
Torquay United F.C. players
Peterborough United F.C. players
Northampton Town F.C. players
Macclesfield Town F.C. players
Rochdale A.F.C. players
English Football League players
National League (English football) players
Buxton F.C. players
Rochdale A.F.C. non-playing staff
Carlisle United F.C. non-playing staff
Oldham Athletic A.F.C. non-playing staff